Robert Hamer (31 March 1911 – 4 December 1963) was a British film director and screenwriter best known for the 1949 black comedy Kind Hearts and Coronets and the now acknowledged 1947 classic It Always Rains on Sunday.

Biography
Hamer was born at 24 Chester Road, Kidderminster, along with his twin Barbara, the son of Owen Dyke Hamer, a bank clerk, and his wife, Annie Grace Brickell. He was educated at Rossall School, an independent school for boys near the town of Fleetwood in Lancashire, and won a scholarship to Corpus Christi College, Cambridge, where he read the Economics tripos. Although claims have since been made that he was sent down (expelled), with several sources suggesting that he was suspended for homosexual activities, he did in fact graduate with a third-class degree in 1933.

The Oxford Dictionary of National Biography states that Hamer originally intended to join the Treasury as an economist or mathematician until scuppered by his poor academic performance, which he later jokingly put down to a combination of "the proximity of Newmarket Heath [racecourse] to Cambridge and the existence in Cambridge of five cinemas changing programmes twice weekly".

Hamer began his film career in 1934 as a cutting room assistant, and from 1935 worked as a film editor involved with such films as Hitchcock's Jamaica Inn (1939) co-produced by Charles Laughton. At the end of the 1930s, he worked on documentaries for the GPO Film Unit. When his boss at the GPO, Alberto Cavalcanti, moved to Ealing Studios, Hamer was invited to join him there. He gained some experience as a director by substituting for colleagues and contributed the 'haunted mirror' sequence to Dead of Night (1945). He followed this with the three Ealing films under his own name for which he is best remembered: Pink String and Sealing Wax (1946), It Always Rains on Sunday (1947), both featuring Googie Withers, and Kind Hearts and Coronets (1949), with Dennis Price and Alec Guinness.

Hamer was an alcoholic, who by the time of his last film as director, School for Scoundrels (1960) was "often battling terrifying DT hallucinations" (i.e. alcohol withdrawal symptoms, occurring only in patients with a history of alcoholism). BFI Screenonline writes that Hamer was "a recovering alcoholic" and that "he fell off the wagon during production [of School For Scoundrels], was sacked on the spot ... and would never work in the industry again." In fact, although he never directed again, he did contribute to two more film screenplays before he died.

Hamer was also homosexual in an era when homosexual acts were illegal in the UK. He died of pneumonia at the age of 52 at St Thomas's Hospital in London, and is buried at Llandegley. Both of his parents survived him.

According to film critic David Thomson, Hamer's career "now looks like the most serious miscarriage of talent in the postwar British cinema".

Filmography

As director 

 Dead of Night (1945) - segment "The Haunted Mirror"
 Pink String and Sealing Wax (1945) - also writer
 It Always Rains on Sunday (1947) - also writer
 Kind Hearts and Coronets (1949) - also writer
 The Spider and the Fly (1949)
 His Excellency (1952) - also writer
 The Long Memory (1953) - also writer
 Father Brown (1954) - also writer
 To Paris with Love (1955)
 The Scapegoat (1959) - also writer
 School for Scoundrels (1960)

Other film work 

 Vessel of Wrath (1938) - editor
 St. Martin's Lane (1938) - editor
 Jamaica Inn (1939) - editor
 French Communique (1940) (documentary short) - editor
 Turned Out Nice Again (1941) - editor
 Ships with Wings (1941) - editor
 The Foreman Went to France (1942) - editor
 My Learned Friend (1943) - associate producer
 San Demetrio London (1943) - producer, writer, uncredited direction
 While Nero Fiddled (1944) - lyrics
 The Loves of Joanna Godden (1947) - uncredited direction
 Rowlandson's England (1955) (documentary short) - writer
 55 Days at Peking (1963) - additional dialogue
 They All Died Laughing (1964) - writer

Televised theater 

 ITV Opening Night at the Guildhall (1955) - play "Private Lives" - director
 ITV Play of the Week (1955) - "A Month in the Country" - director, adaptation
 ITV Play of the Week (1955) - "The Green of the Year" - director, adaptation

References

External links
 oxforddnb: Hamer, Robert James 1911-1963 film Director
 British Film Institute: Screen online
 
 Kind Hearts and Coronets: 60th anniversary of a classic

1911 births
1963 deaths
Alumni of Corpus Christi College, Cambridge
English film directors
English male screenwriters
English LGBT writers
LGBT film directors
British LGBT screenwriters
British gay writers
People educated at Rossall School
People from Kidderminster
Deaths from pneumonia in England
20th-century English screenwriters
20th-century English male writers
20th-century English LGBT people